Odostomia strongi is a species of sea snail, a marine gastropod mollusc in the family Pyramidellidae, the pyrams and their allies.

This species was named for A. M. Strong.

References

External links
 To World Register of Marine Species
 To ITIS

strongi
Gastropods described in 1927